Atlanta Roller Derby (ARD) is a women's flat-track roller derby league based in Atlanta, Georgia. Founded in 2004, as Atlanta Rollergirls, the league finished their fourteenth season in November 2018. Atlanta Roller Derby is a founding member league of the Women's Flat Track Derby Association (WFTDA).

In November 2012, the Atlanta Rollergirls hosted the 2012 WFTDA Championships. In January 2019, the league announced its rebrand as Atlanta Roller Derby.

Early history
In 2004 the Atlanta Roller Derby was started under the leadership of league founder Tanya Hyde (Angela Ward).

Home teams

The majority of ARD skaters compete on a 'home team' only. Home teams practice monthly, and each skating member of the league must take part in the greater management of the league. Members of the Dirty South Derby Girls (DSDG) All-Star team have the option to not skate on a home team, but they must still participate in league management.

The Apocalypstix. 
Colors: Pink/Black  
The Denim Demons.  
Colors: Blue/Red  
The Glamma Rays. - Formally the Sake Tuyas, the Glamma Rays rebranded in the 2018 season.
Colors: Red/White/Black   
The Toxic Shocks. - The Toxic Shocks were added as an expansion team in the 2007 season.  The Shocks increased the total number of Atlanta Roller Derby home teams to four.  The 2007 season was the first year the Shocks won the home team championship.
Colors: Green/Silver

League standings
Home team rankings are based on placement at the end of the season.

Travel teams
Atlanta Roller Derby fields three interleague teams that compete at a variety of levels:
Baby Blue and Red   are the official colors of all Atlanta Roller Derby interleague teams as of the 2014 season.

The Dirty South Derby Girls All-Star Team – Atlanta's internationally ranked and sanctioned Women's Flat Track Derby Association All-Star travel team.
The Rumble Bs - Atlanta's B-Team for exhibition and non-sanctioned games with other leagues. Composed of skaters from each of the home teams, the Rumble Bs serves as a training ground for All-Star skaters. The Rumble Bs travel is generally limited to areas in the Southeastern United States.
The Jukes of Hazzard – Atlanta's C-Team, established in 2011 is composed of skaters from each of the four home teams.  Active skaters who are neither on DSDG nor the Rumble Bs may put their names in for consideration for games. The Jukes of Hazzard have a rotating roster of members based on the game and team they will be playing. The Jukes of Hazzard compete in exhibition and non-sanctioned games.

WFTDA competition

The Dirty South Derby Girls are Atlanta's all-star travel team, competes internationally within the WFTDA, and since its inception has qualified for either WFTDA Championships or Playoffs every year except 2008. Atlanta finished in fourth place at the WFTDA Division 1 Playoff tournaments in 2015, 2015 and 2016. In 2017, Atlanta finished out of the medal round, finishing with a 323-143 victory over Houston Roller Derby.

In 2018, Atlanta served as the host league for a WFTDA Playoff in September, in which they were themselves seeded fourth, and finished outside the top four in the consolation bracket.

Rankings

 CR = consolation round

Atlanta Junior Roller Derby 
ARD have a junior league who are members of the Junior Roller Derby Association and play by their ruleset.

References

External links
Official Website

Roller derby leagues in Georgia (U.S. state)
Women's sports in the United States
Sports teams in Atlanta
Women's Flat Track Derby Association Division 1
Roller derby leagues established in 2004
2004 establishments in Georgia (U.S. state)